Robert Scott (born 22 February 1953) is an English former footballer who played in the Football League for Crewe Alexandra, Hartlepool United, Reading, Rochdale and Wrexham.

Career
Scott was born in Liverpool and began his career with Welsh side Wrexham. Scott had spells with Reading, Hartlepool United and Rochdale before joining Crewe Alexandra. Under the management of Dario Gradi Scott developed a feared reputation as a 'lower league hatchet man'. He spent seven years at Crewe making over 250 appearances before ending his career with a short spell back at Wrexham. He also played non-league football with Northwich Victoria and later ran a nightclub in Wrexham.

Style of play
Throughout his career Scott was known for his tough style of defending which often angered his opponents.

References

External links
 

English footballers
English Football League players
1953 births
Living people
Wrexham A.F.C. players
Reading F.C. players
Hartlepool United F.C. players
Rochdale A.F.C. players
Crewe Alexandra F.C. players
Northwich Victoria F.C. players
Association football defenders